Gauḍa (also known as Gaur, Gour, Lakhnauti, Lakshmanavati and Jannatabad) is a historic city of Bengal in the eastern part of the Indian subcontinent, and one of the most prominent capitals of classical and medieval India, being the capital city of Bengal under several kingdoms. The Gauḍa region was also a province of several pan-Indian empires. During the seventh century, the Gauda Kingdom was founded by King Shashanka, whose reign corresponds with the beginning of the Bengali calendar. Gauda gradually became synonymous with Bengal and Bengalis. It was conquered by Bakhtiyar Khalji, a lieutenant of the Ghurid ruler Muhammad of Ghor in 1203.

For a period of 112 years, between 1453 and 1565, Gauda was the capital of the Bengal Sultanate. In 1500, Gauda was the fifth-most populous city in the world, with a population of 200,000, as well as one of the most densely populated cities in the Indian subcontinent. The Portuguese left detailed accounts of the city. The Sultans built a citadel, many mosques, a royal palace, canals and bridges. Buildings featured glazed tiles.

The city thrived until the collapse of the Bengal Sultanate in the 16th century, when the Mughal Empire took control of the region. When the Mughal Emperor Humayun invaded the region, he renamed the city Jannatabad ("heavenly city"). Most of the surviving structures in Gauda are from the period of the Bengal Sultanate. The city was sacked by Sher Shah Suri. An outbreak of the plague contributed to the city's downfall. The course of the Ganges was once located near the city, but a change in the river's course caused Gauda to lose its strategic importance. A new Mughal capital developed later in Dhaka.

Gauda was one of the most prominent capitals in the history of Bengal and the history of the Indian subcontinent, and a centre of stately medieval architecture. Gauda's ruins were depicted in the artwork of European painters during the 18th and 19th centuries. Colonial officials, such as Francis Buchanan-Hamilton and William Francklin, left detailed surveys of the former Bengali capital.

Geography

Location
It straddles the Bangladesh-India border, with most of its ruins on the Indian side and a few structures on the Bangladeshi side, it was once one of the most populous cities in the world. The ruins of this former city now straddle the international border and are divided between the Malda district of West Bengal and Chapai Nawabganj District of Rajshahi Division. The Kotwali Gate, formerly part of the citadel, now marks the border checkpoint between the two countries.

History

Kingdom of Gauda
After the fall of the Gupta Empire, western Bengal was ruled by the Gauda Kingdom and eastern Bengal by the Samatata Kingdom. Gauda was founded by Shashanka, one of the pioneering Bengali kings in history. Shashanka's reign falls approximately between 590 and 625. The origin of the Bengali calendar falls within the reign of Shashanka.

Pala Empire

The Pala Empire was founded in the Gauda region during the rise of Gopala as king with the approval of an assembly of chieftains. The Pala Emperors carried the title Lord of Gauda. The empire ruled for four centuries and its territory included large parts of northern India. According to historian D. C. Sicar, the term Gauda is an appropriate name for the Pala Empire itself. The Pala period saw the development of the Bengali language, script and other aspects of Bengali culture. Indeed, the term Gaudiya (of Gauda) became synonymous with Bengal and Bengalis.

Sena kingdom
Gauda became known as Lakhnauti during the Sena dynasty. The name was in honour of the Sena ruler Lakhsman Sena.

Sultanate period

Delhi Sultanate
On a campaign towards Tibet in 1206, Bakhtiyar left Shiran Khalji to govern Bengal as a substitute. Bakhtiyar would die after the failure of this expedition, officially leaving Shiran as the next governor of Lakhnauti who would shortly be succeeded by Ali Mardan Khalji and Iwaz Khalji. The latter would declare independence from Delhi which would also lead to his death.

Independent Lakhnauti
In 1281, Nasiruddin Bughra Khan, the Governor of Lakhnauti, declared independence from the Delhi Sultanate. He would be succeeded by his son, Rukunuddin Kaikaus who expanded the kingdom. During his rule, the Lakhnauti-based kingdom expanded into Satgaon in the south, Bihar in the west, Devkot in the north. His successor was Shamsuddin Firuz Shah, who played pivotal roles in completing Kaikaus' work in Satgaon before proceeding to take over Mymensingh and Sonargaon. In 1303, Firuz's nephew Sikandar Khan Ghazi and commander-in-chief Syed Nasiruddin teamed up with Shah Jalal and his forces in the Conquest of Sylhet against the Gour Kingdom. Sylhet was successfully incorporated into Firuz's Lakhnauti kingdom. His successor, Ghiyasuddin Bahadur Shah would lose independence to the Delhi Sultanate once again.

Bengal Sultanate

Gauda was widely known as Gaur during the Bengal Sultanate. The founder of the sultanate, Shamsuddin Ilyas Shah, was Delhi's governor in Satgaon. Ilyas Shah rebelled and overthrew Gaur's governor Alauddin Ali Shah in 1342. Ilyas Shah united the Bengal region into a separate independent state from Delhi in 1352. Pandua became the first capital of the sultanate. In 1450, Sultan Mahmud Shah of Bengal announced the transfer of Bengal's capital from Pandua to Gaur. The transfer was completed by 1453. Gaur served as the Bengali sultanate's capital for over one hundred years until 1565.

Gaur was one of the most densely populated cities in the Indian subcontinent, with a population rivalling that of Fatehpur Sikri. The city had a citadel, a royal palace and durbar, many mosques, residences for aristocrats and merchants, and bazaars. Portuguese travellers left detailed and extensive accounts of Gaur. The Portuguese compared the affluence of the city with Lisbon. The royal palace was divided into three compartments. A high wall enclosed the palace. A moat surrounded the palace on three sides and was connected to the Ganges, which guarded the western side of the citadel. According to a contemporary Vaishnava poet, Sultan Alauddin Hussain Shah once saw a procession led by Sri Chaitanya on the opposite bank of the river. The first compartment in the north included the durbar. An inscription of Sultan Rukunuddin Barbak Shah mentions a fountain and water channel located halfway from the Dakhil Darwaza gate. The gate still stands today. According to the Portuguese and medieval Bengali poet Krittibas Ojha, the road from the Dakhil Darwaza to the durbar had nine well-guarded gates, of which two can still be identified today. The second compartment was the living quarter of the Sultan which was adorned with glazed tiles of various colours. The third compartment was the harem. Many artefacts have been recovered from the palace grounds, including enamelled bricks and Chinese porcelain. In 1521, a Portuguese visitor saw Sultan Nusrat Shah enjoying polo being played on the plains below the citadel. Gaur was the center of regional politics. The deposed Arakanese king Min Saw Mon was granted asylum in Gaur. The Sultan of Bengal dispatched a military expedition from Gaur to achieve the Reconquest of Arakan.

The Portuguese historian Castenhada de Lopez described the houses of Gaur. Most buildings were one-storeyed with ornamental floor tiles, courtyards and gardens. There were canals and bridges. Bengal attracted many Eurasian merchants during the Sultanate period and Gaur was a centre of the trade like other erstwhile Bengali cities, including Pandua, Chittagong, Sonargaon and Satgaon. Bengal also attracted immigrants from North India, the Middle East, and Central Asia.

In the 16th-century, Gaur was occupied by the Mughal emperor Humayun who sought to name it as Jannatabad (heavenly city). The city was looted and plundered during Sher Shah Suri's invasion. After 1565, Sultan Sulaiman Khan Karrani shifted the capital to Tandah. In 1575, Gaur was conquered by a Mughal contingent led by Munim Khan. The Bengal Sultanate ended during the Battle of Rajmahal in 1576.

Mughal period
The Mughals built several structures in Gaur. The two-storeyed Mughal Tahakhana complex was a resting place for viceroys. The tahkhana in Persian means a building with a cool environment. The name indicates that the complex had an indoor ventilation system to moderate humid temperatures. The complex was also used as a Sufi khanqah. The Lukochori Darwaza (hide and seek gate) was erected on the road that led to the complex. The construction of these structures can be traced to the reign of viceroy Shah Shuja. An outbreak of the plague and a change in the course of the Ganges caused the city to be abandoned. Since then the area has been a heap of ruins in the wilderness and almost overgrown with jungle.

Historical measurements and statistics

The facing of masonry and the buildings with which they were covered have now disappeared, and the embankments themselves are overgrown with dense jungle. The western side of the city was washed by the Ganges, and within the space enclosed by these embankments and the river stood the city of Gauḍa proper, with the fort containing the palace in its south-west corner. Radiating north, south and east from the city, other embankments are to be traced running through the suburbs and extending in certain directions for 30 or 40 m. Surrounding the palace is an inner embankment of similar construction to that which surrounds the city, and even more overgrown with jungle. A deep moat protects it on the outside. To the north of the outer embankment lies the Sagar Dighi, a great reservoir, 1600 yd. by 800 yd., dating from 1126.

Fergusson in his History of Eastern Architecture thus describes the general architectural style of Gauḍa:

Notable structures

According to Encyclopædia Britannica Eleventh Edition, "The Tantipar mosque (1475–1480) has beautiful moulding in brick, and the Lotan mosque of the same period is unique in retaining its glazed tiles. The citadel, of the Muslim period, was strongly fortified with a rampart and entered through a magnificent gateway called the Dakhil Darwaza (1459–1474). Nearby were the royal tombs. Within the citadel is the Kadam Rasul mosque (1530), which is still used, and close outside is a tall tower called the Firoz Minar (perhaps signifying tower of victory). There are a number of Muslim buildings on the banks of the Sagar Dighi, including, notably, the tomb of the saint Makhdum Shaikh Akhi Siraj (died 1357), and in the neighbourhood is a burning ghat, traditionally the only one allowed to the use of the Hindus by their Muslim conquerors, and still greatly venerated and frequented by them. Many inscriptions of historical importance have been found in the ruins.."

Preservation

The Archaeological Survey of India and the Department of Archaeology in Bangladesh are responsible for preserving heritage structures in the area. The Bangladeshi Archaeology Department has carried out several projects in both the Bangladeshi and Indian sides of Gauda.

The Indian archaeological survey is also carrying out excavations of a mound about a kilometre from the Chikha building within the Baisgaji Wall where remains of a palace are turning up. A permanent artefact and photographic exhibition highlighting the major monuments of Gour and the restoration work is undertaken by the ASI is being held at the Metcalfe Hall, Kolkata. Among the exhibits are also some fine specimens of brick moulding and glazed tiles from Gour.

Transport
Bus and rail transport are available from Kolkata to Malda town. The nearest railway station is Gour Malda. Although, it is desirable to visit Gauda via Malda Town railway station. Gauda can be accessed through the Sonamosjid checkpoint on the Bangladesh-India border. The checkpoint is located near the Choto Sona Mosque in Chapai Nawabganj district, Bangladesh.

Notes

References
  endnotes:
 M. Martin (Buchanan Hamilton), Eastern India, vol. iii. (1831);
 G. H. Ravenshaw, Gaur (1878);
 James Fergusson, History of Indian and Eastern Architecture (1876);
 Reports of the Archaeological Surveyor, Bengal Circle (1900–1904).

External links

 Gaur at Banglapedia
 
 

Bengal Sultanate
Archaeological sites in Bangladesh
Chapai Nawabganj District
Former populated places in Bangladesh
Buildings and structures in West Bengal
Cities and towns in Malda district
Former populated places in India
Archaeological sites in West Bengal
Former capital cities in India
Ruins in India
Maldah
Capitals of Bengal
Ruins in Bangladesh
Tourist attractions in Malda district